The Projectionist is a 1970 American comedy film written and directed by Harry Hurwitz that was the first feature film with Rodney Dangerfield as an actor. The film employed the use of superimposition of older motion pictures, the first time such techniques were used. The film clips incorporated were scenes from Gone with the Wind, Citizen Kane, Fort Apache, The Birth of a Nation, Casablanca, Gunga Din, Sergeant York, The Maltese Falcon and Barbarella.

Release
Production took place in September and October 1969 and its first public screening was a year later, at the Rochester Film Festival on October 17, 1970. The film opened in New York on January 17, 1971.

Plot
Chuck McCann, the projectionist, is seen operating projection booth equipment followed by The Projectionist opening credits. The Midtown Theater, located in Midtown Manhattan, is managed by Renaldi who continually insults and berates his employees. Spending hours in the projection booth, Chuck imagines himself as the superhero Captain Flash. When Harry, one of the ushers, enters the booth to complain about Renaldi, Chuck describes to him the beautiful woman he saw earlier, calling her "The Girl". Renaldi comes into the booth and rebukes Harry for disobeying his orders not to visit the projection area and criticizes Chuck for leaving a cigarette butt on the floor.

His mood spoiled, Chuck starts to rewind a film reel and listens to a radio broadcast, hearing, "the way I see things, I'm not very optimistic at all, I just don't think there's much hope for the future", followed by an on-screen trailer, "COMING SOON, The Terrible World of Tomorrow — SEE man become the dehumanized slave of science —  SEE Years of Racial Hatred Erupt in an Orgy of Blood-Lust / As One Half of The World Assaults the Other — SEE the Horror of Total Holocaust  — SEE Man Destroyed by his Own Technology / and the World Explodes in a Blaze of Hellish Fury — SEE The End of Mankind in… / The Terrible World of Tomorrow", as the radio broadcast continues, "no.. how can we disagree with Doctor Masters… gentlemen… gentlemen… gentlemen… what we're missing is the point about..."

At the end of his working day, Chuck looks at movie star photographs on the booth's wall and cabinets and impersonates the voice and mannerisms of Humphrey Bogart with quotes of film dialogue from The Treasure of the Sierra Madre, The Caine Mutiny and The Maltese Falcon (for which he also does Sydney Greenstreet). He then imitates Wallace Beery in Min and Bill, John Wayne in The Green Berets, James Stewart in The Spirit of St. Louis and Clark Gable in Gone with the Wind (for which he also does Butterfly McQueen). Finally, McCann (who hosted, from 1960 to 1962, the New York City daily children's TV show Laurel and Hardy and Chuck) glances at a photo of Laurel and Hardy and recreates their voices ("Say goodnight Stanley", "Goodnight Stanley") then, switching to Bogart, ends with, "So long, Fred C. Dobbs".

Bored with the lack of excitement and romance in his life, Chuck continues to fantasize about his adventures as Captain Flash and imagines Renaldi as a villain known as The Bat who has six henchmen and wants to possess the X-ray device invented by the aged European scientist who is in reality the old man who speaks with an accent and runs the theater's candy concession stand. The Bat kidnaps the scientist's beautiful daughter, takes Captain Flash prisoner and raves about ruling the world. The daughter, however, turns out to be skilled in karate and, with Captain Flash, defeats The Bat and dances with Captain Flash into a Busby Berkeley musical.

Cast

Michael Gentry…..Usher / The Bat's henchman
Lucky Kargo…..Usher / The Bat's henchman
Sam Stewart…..Usher / The Bat's henchman
David Holliday…..Fat Man / The Bat's henchman
Alex Stevens…..Usher / The Bat's henchman
Robert Lee…..Usher / The Bat's henchman
Daniel Maffia
Stephen Phillips…..Minister
Morocco…..Belly dancer
Clara Rosenthal…..Crazy lady
Jacquelyn Glenn…..Nude on bearskin

Robert Staats as the Pitchman
Robert King as the Premiere M.C.
Uncredited
Harry Hurwitz…..Harry, the usher who visits Chuck in the projectionist's booth
João Fernandes…..Man on street

References

External links 

1971 films
1970s fantasy comedy films
American fantasy comedy films
American independent films
Collage film
Films directed by Harry Hurwitz
Films set in a movie theatre
Films set in New York City
1971 directorial debut films
1971 comedy films
1970s English-language films
1970s American films